Riccardo Bonetto (born 20 March 1979 in Asolo, Treviso) is an Italian football of Bassano Virtus.

Career
He also played at Serie A level with Empoli and Livorno. Bonetto was sold to Empoli in co-ownership deal in 2001 from Juve, for €516,000. In June 2003 Juventus gave up the remain registration rights to Empoli.

External links
 Riccardo Bonetto – scheda calciatore

1979 births
Living people
People from Asolo
Italian footballers
Juventus F.C. players
Novara F.C. players
Fermana F.C. players
Ascoli Calcio 1898 F.C. players
U.S. Livorno 1915 players
Empoli F.C. players
S.S. Lazio players
Bologna F.C. 1909 players
Association football defenders
Serie A players
Serie B players
Italian expatriate footballers
K.S.K. Beveren players
Belgian Pro League players
S.S.D. Lucchese 1905 players
S.S. Arezzo players
Bassano Virtus 55 S.T. players
Association football utility players
Sportspeople from the Province of Treviso
Footballers from Veneto